Stadion Střelecký ostrov is a football stadium in České Budějovice, Czech Republic, located near the Vltava River. It is currently used as the home ground of SK Dynamo České Budějovice. The stadium holds 6,681 people and was built in 1940. Before renovation in 2003 it had a capacity of 12,000 people (1,500 seated). The city and the club were however forced to reconstruct and modernize the stadium to meet the football association criteria. The stadium subsequently had an all-seated capacity of 6,681.

International matches
Stadion Střelecký ostrov has hosted one competitive match of the Czech Republic national football team

References

External links 
 Photo gallery and data at Erlebnis-stadion.de
 Stadium info from Dynamo ČB official site 

Football venues in the Czech Republic
Czech First League venues
SK Dynamo České Budějovice
Buildings and structures in České Budějovice
Sports venues completed in 1940
1940 establishments in Czechoslovakia
20th-century architecture in the Czech Republic